Hong Kong protests refers to various protests, demonstrations, or marches that have taken place in Hong Kong. It may refer to:

Annual events 

 Hong Kong new year marches
 Hong Kong 1 July marches
 Memorials for the 1989 Tiananmen Square protests

Individual events 

 Hong Kong 1956 riots
 1966 Hong Kong riots
 Hong Kong 1967 riots
 1981 Hong Kong riots
 December 2005 protest for democracy in Hong Kong
 2010 Marches for Universal Suffrage
 Occupy Central (2011–12)
 Anti-parallel trading protests, 2012 to 2015
 Reclaim Sheung Shui Station, 2012
 2015 Yuen Long protest
 2012 Kong Qingdong incident
 2013 Hong Kong dock strike
 2014 Hong Kong protests
 Umbrella Movement
 2014 Hong Kong class boycott campaign
 2016 Mong Kok civil unrest
 2019–2020 Hong Kong protests (timeline)
 12 June 2019 Hong Kong protest
 Storming of the Legislative Council Complex
 Hong Kong Way
 Chinese University of Hong Kong conflict
 Siege of the Hong Kong Polytechnic University
 Local effects of the Hong Kong national security law

See also 
 Hong Kong–Mainland China conflict
 Democratic development in Hong Kong
 1989 Tiananmen Square protests
 Human rights in Hong Kong